One of the goals of the Economic Community of West African States (ECOWAS) is the development of an integrated railroad network.

Aims include the extension of railways in member countries, the interconnection of previously isolated railways and the standardisation of gauge, brakes, couplings, and other parameters.

Proposed lines 
The first line would connect the cities and ports of Lagos, Cotonou, Lomé and Accra and would allow the largest container ships to focus on a smaller number of large ports, while efficiently serving a larger hinterland.  This line connects  gauge and  systems, which would require four rail dual gauge, which can also provide standard gauge.

Gauge (railway)

Standards 
 Brakes: Air brakes
 Electrification: 25 kV AC
 Couplings: vary

See also 
 AfricaRail

References 

Economic Community of West African States
Rail transport in Africa